Jong Kwang-bom (born 29 July 2001) is a North Korean short track speed skater. He competed in the 2018 Winter Olympics.

In the 2018 Winter Olympics, Jong slipped in the start of the 500m heats and tripped over Japanese speed skater Keita Watanabe. Also after restarting the race, Jong bumped into Watanabe before tumbling on the ice.

References

2001 births
Living people
North Korean male short track speed skaters
Olympic short track speed skaters of North Korea
Short track speed skaters at the 2018 Winter Olympics
21st-century North Korean people